Peter Boltun (born January 2, 1993) is a Slovak professional ice hockey forward currently playing for HK Dukla Michalovce of the Tipsport Liga.

Boltun made his Tipsport Liga debut with HC Košice during the 2012–13 season. He later joined HK Poprad in 2014 for one season before returning to Košice. On May 30, 2019, Boltun signed with his hometown team HK Dukla Michalovce following their promotion to the Tipsport Liga.

References

External links

1993 births
Living people
HK Dukla Michalovce players
HC Košice players
People from Michalovce
Sportspeople from the Košice Region
HK Poprad players
Slovak ice hockey forwards
Competitors at the 2013 Winter Universiade